Luce Guilbeault (5 March 1935 – 12 July 1991) was a Canadian actress and director from Quebec. She was one of the leading figures of Quebec repertory theatre of the 1960s and one of the most-sought actresses of Quebec cinema in the 1970s. She received a Canadian Film Award in 1975 and the first Prix Iris from the National Film Board of Canada in 1991 for her life's work.

Biography

Raised in Montreal as a doctor's daughter, Luce Guilbeault was introduced to the arts at an early age, particularly in music and theatre. She studied for five years with William Graves at the National Film Board of Canada (NFB), using the Stanislawski method, then studied for a few years at the Actors Studio in New York.

Guilbeault's career began in the theatre, where she excelled in the Quebec repertoire (e.g.: Réjean Ducharme, Michel Tremblay).  She is most remembered for her career in the cinema, with some 20 films to her credit. Her first major film role was that of a disillusioned wife in Denys Arcand's La Maudite Galette (1972) followed by Réjeanne Padovani (1973). She played in O.K. ... Laliberté (1973) by Marcel Carrière, Tendresse ordinaire (1973) by Jacques Leduc and in the films of Anne Claire Poirier.

As a director, Guilbeault mainly created biographies of feminists, including actress Denise Benoît and a series of American feminists. She also directed the 1978 direct cinema film D'abord Ménagères which documented housework and the status of women in Quebec.

Around 1990 Guilbeault wanted to write a booklet about the fate of aging actresses, composing an interview list of her contemporaries, "with nothing to lose ... and willing to confide."  She found a publisher but was refused a grant from the Ministry of Culture. She died from cancer on 12 July 1991 and was entombed at the Notre Dame des Neiges Cemetery in Montreal.

Legacy

In 2000 the feature-length biographical documentary Luce Guilbeault, explorActrice was produced by the NFB, directed by Marcel Jean.

In 2016 Ariel Borremans assembled the book Ma mère dans l'oeil de mon père which features photographs of his mother, Guilbault, taken by his father, Guy Borremans (1934–2012).  The photographs are accompanied by texts from Quebec artists including Michel Tremblay, André Melançon, Réjean Ducharme, and Denys Arcand.  Critic Antoine Aubert noted that, beyond the grace of the actress and the love of the photographer for his muse, it tells of an artistic history essential to the identity of Quebec.

Filmography

1957-1959 –  (TV series)
1971 –  (mini-series)
1972 – Françoise Durocher, Waitress – l'une des Françoise Durocher
1972 – IXE-13 – Palma
1972 – Dirty Money (La Maudite galette) – Berthe
1972 – The Time of the Hunt (Le Temps d'une chasse) – La Rousse
1973 – Souris, tu m'inquiètes
1973 – La Dernière neige
1973 – O.K. ... Laliberté
1973 – Tendresse ordinaire – Luce
1973 –  – Questa
1973 – Réjeanne Padovani – Réjeanne Padovani
1974 – Par une belle nuit d'hiver 
1974 –  – Muriel
1975 –  (TV series) – Justine Demers
1975 – Mustang – Marie
1975 – Before the Time Comes (Le Temps de l'avant) – Hélène
1976 – Bargain Basement 
1977 – J.A. Martin Photographer – Madame Beaupré
1978 – Passages
1978 – Angela – Marie Lebrecque
1979 – A Scream from Silence (Mourir à tue-tête) – a client
1980-1986 –  (TV series) – Georgette Garon-Laflamme 
1982 – Beyond Forty – Hélène
1986 – Qui a tiré sur nos histoires d'amour – Lady
1986-1989 –  (TV series) – Claire Trudel
1989-1991 –  (TV series) – Claire Trudel
1990 – La Nuit du visiteur

Awards
In 1976 Guilbeault received a Canadian Film Award for Best Actress in a Non-Feature for Bargain Basement
In 1991 Guilbeault received the first Prix Iris from the National Film Board of Canada for all of her work.

References

1935 births
1991 deaths
Actresses from Montreal
Canadian feminists
Deaths from cancer in Quebec
Film directors from Montreal
French Quebecers
Canadian film actresses
Canadian documentary film directors
Canadian women film directors
Canadian television actresses
Burials at Notre Dame des Neiges Cemetery
Canadian women documentary filmmakers